The Cadusii (also called Cadusians; , Kadoúsioi; Latin: Cadusii) were an ancient Iranian tribe that lived in the mountains between Media and the shore of the Caspian Sea. The area that the Cadusii lived in bordered that of the Anariacae and Albani. The Dareitai and Pantimati people may have been part of the Cadusii.

According to tradition, the legendary Assyrian king Ninus subdued the Cadusii. The Greek physician and historian Ctesias was highly interested in the Cadusii, incorporating them in his invented history of an early Median dynasty. The Cadusii later voluntarily submitted to Cyrus the Great, the first ruler of the Achaemenid Empire (550 BC–330 BC). According to Xenophon, as Cyrus was about to pass away, he appointed his younger son Tanaoxares (Bardiya) as satrap over the Medes, Armenians, and Cadusii.

The Cadusii were most likely part of the satrapy of Media, and perhaps occasionally that of Hyrcania. Although they fought on side of the Achaemenids under a certain Artagerses at the Battle of Cunaxa in 401 BC, the Cadusii appear to have had ongoing conflicts with the Achaemenid central administration. They are known to have led numerous revolts, including one that began around 405 BC, near the end of Darius II's rule, and lasted until the rebellion of Cyrus the Younger. Around 380 BC, king Artaxerxes II led an expedition against the Cadusii, which in the words of German Iranologist Rüdiger Schmitt "was a complete fiasco". The Achaemenid forces only managed to retreat through the diplomatic efforts by the satrap Tiribazus. Artaxerxes II himself was forced to march on foot.

In the 350s BC, during the reign of Artaxerxes III, another Achaemenid expedition was made against the Cadusii. During a battle, Artashata (later known as Darius III) distinguished himself by slaying a warrior in single combat. His exploit was noticed by Artaxerxes III, who sent him gifts and gave him the satrapy of Armenia. Some historians report that the Cadusian contingent fought together with Medes and other Northerners in the Achaemenid forces at the Battle of Gaugamela against the Macedonians. Other historians, however, describe a different ethnic composition of the army.

According to the Iranologist Richard N. Frye, the Cadusii may be the ancestors of the Talysh people. Local Talysh experts commonly claim that the Talyshis are descended from the Cadusii. According to Garnik Asatrian and Habib Borjian; "this is one of the rare cases when a folk self-identification with an ancient people can be, at least tentatively, substantiated with historical and linguistic backgrounds."

Notes

References

Sources

 
  
 
 
 
 
 
  

 
Ancient peoples
History of Talysh
History of Gilan
Historical Iranian peoples